László Sebián-Petrovszki (born in Békéscsaba, Hungary on 15 September 1977) is a Hungarian academic and politician. He is a member of parliament in the National Assembly of Hungary (Országgyűlés) since 2 December 2019. In 2004, he served as a secretary of state in the Prime Minister's Office. During the 2022 general elections he was re-elected member of parliament. He is also the second openly-gay MP in the Hungarian National Assembly.

References 

Living people
People from Békéscsaba
1977 births
Hungarian academics
Hungarian politicians
21st-century Hungarian politicians
Members of the National Assembly of Hungary (2018–2022)
Members of the National Assembly of Hungary (2022–2026)
Democratic Coalition (Hungary) politicians
Hungarian LGBT politicians
Hungarian gay men
LGBT legislators
LGBT academics